Thomas West of Poplar Neck (c. 1670 – 1710) was a planter, military officer and politician of King William County in the British Colony and Dominion of Virginia who for two consecutive terms represented the county in the House of Burgesses (1706–1706). He followed the planter, military officer and burgess traditions of his father John West and brothers John West and Nathaniel West. His wife Agnes bore a son, also Thomas West, who also served (briefly) in the House of Burgesses.

References

1670 births
1710 deaths
Virginia colonial people
House of Burgesses members
People from King William County, Virginia
Thomas West (captain)